Viktor Mikhailovich Reznikov (9 May 1952 in Leningrad – 25 February 1992 in Saint Petersburg) was a Russian Soviet composer, lyricist and singer. He was mostly known for his songs written for Soviet artists such as Alla Pugacheva, Mikhail Boyarsky, Larisa Dolina, Anne Veski, Valery Leontiev, Sofia Rotaru, ensemble Pesniary, Irina Ponarovskaya, Dmitry Malikov, Roza Rymbayeva, Jaak Joala, Irina Otieva, American group The Cover Girls and the Soviet-American group "SUS".

Death
On 22 February 1992 Reznikov crashed his car while driving his VAZ-2106 to take daughter Anna to his mother. The daughter was not injured. The accident occurred in front of the composer's mother, who stood on the other side of the street. Reznikov spent two days at the Military Medical Academy in St. Petersburg, but he died on 25 February. He was buried at a Komarovskoye cemetery in the suburbs of St. Petersburg.

References

See also
The Cover Girls (single "Don't Stop Now", 1990)
Music Speaks Louder Than Words (CD released by Epic Records in 1990)

1952 births
1992 deaths
Russian composers
Russian male composers
Soviet composers
Soviet male composers
Soviet male singers
Musicians from Saint Petersburg
Singers from Saint Petersburg
20th-century Russian singers
20th-century classical musicians
20th-century composers
Road incident deaths in Russia
20th-century Russian male singers